Nathalia Acevedo (born November 22, 1984) is a Mexican actress best known for her acting debut in Carlos Reygadas' Post Tenebras Lux which premiered in competition at the 2012 Cannes Film Festival and won for Reygadas the Best Director Award. Her most notable roles since include starring alongside Tadanobu Asano, in Filipino cult director Khavn De La Cruz’s, Ruined Heart, in 2014 (shot by Christopher Doyle and premiering at the Tokyo Film Festival 2014) and starring in Illum Jacobi's The Trouble with Nature.

Filmography
Post Tenebras Lux (2012) 
Ruined Heart (2014) 
Princesita (2017)
The Trouble with Nature (2020)

References

External links
 

Mexican film actresses
Actresses from Mexico City
1984 births
Living people